Hydrocotyle umbellata is an aquatic plant that thrives in wet, sandy habitat. Its English common name is manyflower marshpennywort or dollarweed. It is native to North America and parts of South America. In Brazil it is known as acariçoba and has applications in herbal medicine with purported anxiolytic, analgesic and anti-inflammatory properties. It can also be found growing as an introduced species and sometimes a noxious weed on other continents. It is an edible weed that can be used in salads or as a pot herb.

References

External links 
Jepson Manual Treatment
Photo gallery
More pictures

umbellata
Aquatic plants
Flora of North America
Flora of Central America
Flora of South America
Plants described in 1753
Taxa named by Carl Linnaeus